First Offenders is a 1939 American crime film starring Walter Abel, Beverly Roberts and Iris Meredith.

Plot
A crusading and reform-minded District Attorney resigns from his position in order to open establish a farm that give juvenile delinquents and first-offenders a place to straighten out their lives before they reach the point of no return. He meets much resistance from various segments of the law and the citizens.

References

External links

1939 films
Columbia Pictures films
Films directed by Frank McDonald
1939 crime drama films
American crime drama films
American black-and-white films
1930s American films
1930s English-language films